Pseuduvaria glabrescens is a species of plant in the family Annonaceae. It is native to Australia. L.W. Jessup, the botanist who first formally described the species using the synonym Pseuduvaria mulgraveana var. glabrescens, named it after the underside of its leaves which have the quality of becoming hairless ( in Latin) as they mature.

Description
It is a tree reaching 9 meters in height. Its young, dark brown to black branches are sparsely hairy but turn hairless.  The young branches are also densely covered in lenticels. Its elliptical to oval, membranous to papery leaves are 7–16.5 by 2–6.5 centimeters. The leaves have rounded bases and tapering tips, with the tapering portion 3-16 millimeters long. The leaves are hairless on their upper surface.  The undersides of the leaves are sparsely hairy but become hairless. The leaves have 8-12 pairs of secondary veins emanating from their midribs. Its sparsely hairy petioles are 1.5-6 by 0.6-2.5 millimeters with a broad groove on their upper side. Its Inflorescences are solitary and are organized on indistinct peduncles. Each inflorescence has a solitary flower. Each flower is on a hairless to slightly hairy pedicel that is 17-50 by 0.2-1.2 millimeters. The pedicels have a medial, hairless to slightly hairy bract that is 0.5-1.2 millimeters long. The flowers are unisexual. Its flowers have 3 oval sepals, that are 1-2 by 1-1.5 millimeters. The sepals are hairless on their upper surface and margins, and hairless to slightly hairy on their lower surface. Its 6 petals are arranged in two rows of 3. The cream-colored, oval to egg-shaped, outer petals are 3.5-6 by 2.5-6.5 millimeters with hairless upper surfaces and sparsely hairy lower surfaces. The inner petals are cream-colored with pink to purple highlights near their edges. The diamond-shaped, inner petals have a 1.5-3.5 millimeter long claw at their base and a 6.5-8 by 4.5-7 millimeter blade.  The inner petals have pointed bases and tips that form a right angle. The upper surfaces of the inner petals are sparsely hairy except near their tips where the hairs are denser. The lower surfaces of the inner petals are sparsely hairy. The inner petals have a pair of prominent, smooth, elliptical glands on their upper surface. Male flowers have up to 70-80 stamens that are 0.9-1 by 0.6-0.9 millimeters. Female flowers have up to 22-29 carpels that are 1.5-2 by 0.5-0.9 millimeters.  Each carpel has 1-2 ovules. Female flowers also have 6-17 sterile stamen. The fruit occur in clusters of 3–18 on hairless pedicles that are 38-55 by 0.7-2 millimeters. The orange, mature fruit are elliptical to globe-shaped and 7-16 by 6-12 millimeters with a tapering tip about 0.5-0.8 millimeters long. The fruit are smooth, and densely hairy. Each fruit has 2 spherical seeds that are 8–9.5 by 7.5-9 by 5-7 millimeters. The seeds are wrinkly.

Reproductive biology
The pollen of P. glabrescens is shed as permanent tetrads. Its flowers are pollinated by flies.

Habitat and distribution
It has been observed growing in rocky or clay soil types in vine forests at elevations of 100–820 meters.

Uses
Oils extracted from its leaves contain high levels of elemicin and methyl eugenol.

References

glabrescens
Flora of Queensland
Endemic flora of Australia
Plants described in 1987
Taxa named by Yvonne Chuan Fang Su
Taxa named by Richard M.K. Saunders